Jeff "Mad Dog" Madden was the strength and conditioning coach for the college football team of the University of Texas, the Texas Longhorns.   He coached the team during the 2005 National Championships.

Among his students are two Heisman Trophy winners: Rashaan Salaam and Ricky Williams.

Madden attended and graduated from Vanderbilt University in Nashville, Tennessee. He was a football player for the Commodores from 1978–1982. The team was 8–3 in the regular season and played in the Hall of Fame Bowl, one of only three bowl games Vanderbilt has played. The team narrowly missed winning the SEC Championship. Madden was a linebacker and team leader.

References

Year of birth missing (living people)
Living people
Players of American football from Cleveland
Vanderbilt Commodores football players
Coaches of American football from Ohio
American strength and conditioning coaches
Cincinnati Bearcats football coaches
Rice Owls football coaches
Colorado Buffaloes football coaches
North Carolina Tar Heels football coaches
Texas Longhorns football coaches